The first Peace of Pressburg was a peace treaty concluded in Pressburg (then Pozsony, today's Bratislava).  It was signed on 2 July 1271 between King Ottokar II of Bohemia and King Stephen V of Hungary. Under this agreement, Hungary renounced its claims on western Austrian provinces and Ottokar renounced the support of Stephen's internal opposition and promised the extradition of them.

Pressburg
History of Bratislava
Peace treaties of Hungary
1271 in Europe
Ottokar II of Bohemia